The Enzian Theater is a nonprofit arthouse movie theater located in Maitland, Florida.  The theater hosts the Florida Film Festival and several other local film festivals.  The name "Enzian" is the German word for gentian, a genus of mountain flower.

Patrons sit in chairs around tables where drinks and meals are served during the film.

The Enzian's motto is "Film Is Art".

See also
John Tiedtke

External links
 
  Enzian Theatre Reviews
 Florida Film Festival 

Theatres in Florida
Buildings and structures in Orange County, Florida
Tourist attractions in Orange County, Florida
Maitland, Florida
501(c)(3) organizations